Joel McNeely (born March 28, 1959) is an American composer, arranger, musician, lyricist, and record producer. A protégé of composer Jerry Goldsmith, he is best known for his film and television scores. He won the Primetime Emmy Award for Outstanding Music Composition for a Series for his work on The Young Indiana Jones Chronicles. He frequently collaborates with Seth MacFarlane and contributes to various projects by The Walt Disney Company.

Biography
Joel McNeely was born in Madison, Wisconsin. Both of his parents were involved in music and theater, and as a child he played the piano, saxophone, bass, and flute. He attended the Interlochen Arts Academy in Michigan, studied jazz at the University of Miami, and earned a master's degree as a composition major at the Eastman School of Music.

LucasArts chose McNeely to compose the soundtrack to the 1996 Star Wars video game, Shadows of the Empire, while incorporating the themes from the films by John Williams. This was an experimental project where he conveyed general moods and themes instead of writing music to flow for specific scenes.

He is also known for conducting a series of re-recordings of film scores by Bernard Herrmann, Franz Waxman, John Barry, and other composers under the label of Varèse Sarabande, including those Herrmann wrote for Vertigo, Psycho and Citizen Kane. He also composed the score for The Avengers and the theme and music for FOX's Dark Angel. Additionally, he scored the movies Terminal Velocity, Iron Will (which was used in the teaser trailer to Toy Story, the theatrical trailer to Balto, the direct-to-video trailer to Balto III: Wings of Change, and the VHS trailer to Mulan), Flipper, Gold Diggers, Samantha, Virus, and I Know Who Killed Me. He also scored a multitude of Disney animated films (Mulan II, Return to Never Land, The Jungle Book 2, Tinker Bell and many others).

Currently McNeely scores occasional episodes of the FOX animated TV series American Dad!, since the fourth season replacing Ron Jones who left to focus more on composing for Family Guy, including the episode with the Back to the Future parody, and the season five premiere (among others).

McNeely is also composed the score for Disneyland Paris'''s Entertainment Shows including: Disney Dreams! & Mickey And The Magician.

McNeely has produced three of Seth MacFarlane's studio albums, including 2011's Music Is Better Than Words, 2014's Holiday for Swing, and 2017's In Full Swing.

In 2017, he composed a score for MacFarlane's new series, The Orville'', along with Bruce Broughton and John Debney.

Filmography

Film

1980s

1990s

2000s

2010s

Television

Awards and nominations

References

External links
 
 
 Interview with Joel McNeely at FilmMusicSite.com

1959 births
American classical musicians
American film score composers
American male film score composers
American television composers
Animated film score composers
Animation composers
Classical musicians from Wisconsin
Living people
Male television composers
Musicians from Madison, Wisconsin
Primetime Emmy Award winners
University of Miami alumni